Matthew Thomas Odmark (born January 25, 1974) is an American musician most known for being a guitarist for Christian alternative folk rock group Jars of Clay.

Biography
Matthew Odmark was raised in Rochester, New York where he attended McQuaid Jesuit High School. He studied English literature at the University of Rochester. As a youth he knew pianist Charlie Lowell. When guitarist Matt Bronleewe left Lowell's band Jars of Clay, Odmark took his place as guitarist and backing vocalist.

In 2001, Jars of Clay were awarded honorary graduations from Greenville College due to their demonstrated understanding of their craft. Despite never being an attendee of the school, Odmark was granted this award also.

Personal life
Matthew Odmark is married to Kristen Odmark. They adopted their son, Dylan Matthew Odmark, in 2007.  They adopted another son, Owen Leigh Odmark, in 2009.

Awards
In 2001, at the Orville H. Gibson Guitar Awards, Odmark received "Best Acoustic Guitar (Male)".

References

American rock guitarists
American male guitarists
Living people
1974 births
Jars of Clay members
Christian music songwriters
American performers of Christian music